Elia Tuqiri (born 6 March 1982) is former professional rugby league and rugby union player who played for the Brisbane Broncos and NSW Waratahs. He is the cousin of dual international Lote Tuqiri, Fijian international winger Nemani Nadolo and Wallabies centre Tevita Kuridrani. They all hail from one of the most famous rugby nurseries in Fiji, Namatakula Village.    

Elia is currently the assistant coach for GPS Rugby Union in Brisbane’s Premier Rugby competition.

References

External links
 

1982 births
Living people
Australian rugby league players
Brisbane Broncos players
New South Wales Waratahs players
Rugby league wingers
Toowoomba Clydesdales players